Governor Ward may refer to:

Alfred Dudley Ward (1905–1991), Governor of Gibraltar from 1962 to 1965
Charles Ward (Deputy Governor of Bombay), Deputy Governor of Bombay from 1682 to 1683
Henry George Ward (1797–1860), 11th Governor of British Ceylon from 1855 to 1860
Marcus Lawrence Ward (1812–1884), 21st Governor of New Jersey
Richard Ward (governor) (1689–1763), Governor of the Colony of Rhode Island and Providence Plantations from 1741 to 1742
Samuel Ward (Rhode Island politician) (1725–1776), 31st and 33rd Governor of the Colony of Rhode Island and Providence Plantations from 1762 to 1763 and from 1765 to 1767

See also
Henry Warde (governor) (1766–1834), Governor of Barbados from 1821 to 1827